Sarah Pinder is a Canadian poet.

Her debut poetry collection, Cutting Room, was published in 2012, and she followed up with Common Place in 2017. Common Place received a Lambda Literary Award nomination for Lesbian Poetry at the 30th Lambda Literary Awards in 2018.

Works
Cutting Room (2012)
Common Place (2017)

References

External links

21st-century Canadian poets
21st-century Canadian women writers
Canadian women poets
Canadian LGBT poets
Writers from Toronto
Living people
Year of birth missing (living people)
21st-century Canadian LGBT people